This is the discography of American rock band Daughtry.  The band was created following the participation of singer Chris Daughtry in the fifth season of American Idol and has so far released six studio albums and an EP.

The eponymous first album Daughtry was released on November 21, 2006, and was a commercial success. It debuted at No.2, sold 304,000 units in its first week, and was the fastest selling rock album in SoundScan history. It has since been certified 4× platinum in the US, and has sold more than 7 million worldwide.  It produced five consecutive singles in the top five of the Adult Top 40 radio charts; three of these, "It's Not Over", "Home", and "Over You" have each sold over 1 or more million copies in the US.

The second album, Leave This Town, reached No. 1 on its debut week and sold 269,000 units in its first week. It has since sold over a million copies in the US. This album has spawned three top ten songs on the Adult Pop chart: "No Surprise", "Life After You", and "September". The band's third studio album, Break the Spell, was released in November 2011. It debuted at number eight on the Billboard 200 and was certified Gold by the RIAA for selling over 500,000 units in the United States. In November 2013, the band released their fourth studio album, Baptized, which debuted at number six on the Billboard 200. In February 2016, the band released their greatest hits album, It's Not Over...The Hits So Far, which debuted at number 43 on the Billboard 200 and number 6 on the U.S. rock chart.

Cage to Rattle was released in 2018 and Dearly Beloved was released in 2021.

Albums

Studio albums

Compilation albums

Extended plays

Singles

As a lead artist

Promotional singles

Other charted songs

Guest appearances
The following are songs by other artists featuring Daughtry frontman Chris Daughtry, with the exception of "Long Way Down", "Drown In You" and "Waitin' for the Bus/Jesus Just Left Chicago" which feature the entire band.

Music videos

Notes

References

 
 
Discographies of American artists
American Idol discographies
Rock music group discographies